Joseph Cabi ben Simon was a Herodian-era High Priest of Israel in Jerusalem, Iudaea Province, appointed (and deposed) by Herod Agrippa II.

References

1st-century High Priests of Israel